Emanuela Alexa (born April 2, 1992), known professionally as Emaa (stylized in all caps), is a Romanian singer and songwriter. She is of Moldovan descent. She became known in 2020 after the release of the song "Insula", in collaboration with The Motans, which brought her collaboration with Global Records.

Life and career
Emanuela Alexa was born on April 2, 1992, in Lugoj, Romania. Emaa started singing as a child, being encouraged by her mother and grandparents. At the age of three, she participated in Tip Top MiniTop, a televised children's talent contest. She finished high school in her hometown and moved to Timișoara, where she studied at the Faculty of Sociology and Psychology at West University.

After graduating from college, Emaa started playing with the alternative rock band BAB from Timişoara as a composer and vocal soloist. In 2015, she began a long-term collaboration with Silent Strike and released her first single, "Mâine", with Deliric.

In 2017, Emaa was the female voice in the tracks on the album released by Silent Strike and entitled It`s Not Safe To Turn Off Your Computer.

In 2018, she worked with Silent Strike, Deliric, Seek Music and Paul Parker on the soundtrack for the HBO-based Hackerville television series.

In 2020, after signing with Global Records, she had a collaboration with Sickotoy for the song "Gasolina".

In October 2020, The Motans and Emaa released the song "Insula". On December 1, 2020, the artist released her first studio album, Macii înfloresc iarna, which contains four songs performed by Emaa and three collaborations with Bastien, Bruja and Killa Fonic.

Discography

Studio album

Singles

As lead artist

As featured artist

Awards and nominations

Filmography

References

External links 
 

1992 births
People from Lugoj
21st-century Romanian singers
21st-century Romanian women singers
Romanian dance musicians
Romanian women pop singers
Romanian women singers
Global Records artists
English-language singers from Romania
Living people